Seacoal (also written sea coal or sea-coal) may refer to:

 Coal that washes up on the seashore
 Seacoal (film), a 1985 feature film depicting the lives of the seacoaling community of Lynemouth, Northumberland
 (Historical sense of the term only) Coal shipped by sea from another port, such as from Newcastle to London
 (Historical sense of the term only) A class of coal especially suitable for steam engines of ships at sea and locomotives; see coal § sea coal.

See also
Mary Seacole (1805-1881), black British-Jamaican woman who set up the "British Hotel" for soldiers' welfare situated near the front line during the Crimean War